Airport West is a suburb in Melbourne, Victoria, Australia,  north-west of Melbourne's Central Business District, located within the City of Moonee Valley local government area.

Bounded by the Calder Freeway to the south, the Tullamarine Freeway to the east, and the Western Ring Road to the north west, Airport West is so named for its position to the west of Essendon Airport, Melbourne's first general airport now used for light planes, charter and freight since the opening in 1970 of Melbourne Airport, located to the north of the suburb.
 
It has the distinction of being the only locality in Australia which does not itself contain an airport to contain the word "Airport."

History

The present Airport West post office opened on 22 November 1982. The Niddrie North office which opened in 1960 was known as Airport West between 1974 and 1982, before reverting back to Niddrie North.

Demographics

According to the :

The most common ancestries in Airport West were Australian 18.3%, English 18.2%, Italian 17.7%, Irish 8.4% and Scottish 5.6%.

In Airport West, 67.2% of people were born in Australia. The most common countries of birth were Italy 7.2%, India 2.6%, England 1.5%, Greece 1.4% and New Zealand 1.1%.

The most common responses for religion in Airport West were Catholic 44.6%, No Religion, so described 21.8%, Not stated 8.7%, Anglican 6.0% and Eastern Orthodox 5.0%. In Airport West, Christianity was the largest religious group reported overall (69.2%) (this figure excludes not stated responses).

In Airport West, 65.9% of people only spoke English at home. Other languages spoken at home included Italian 10.8%, Greek 3.0%, Mandarin 1.4%, Maltese 1.1% and Hindi 1.1%.

Transport

Tram route 59 travels from Westfield Airport West (at Matthews Avenue), then runs via Matthews Avenue, Keilor Road, Mount Alexander Road, Fletcher Street, Pascoe Vale Road, Mount Alexander Road, Flemington Road and then terminates at the corner of Elizabeth Street and Flinders Street, at Flinders Street station.

The Albion-Jacana freight line passes through Airport West near its north and west boundary. A railway line to Melbourne Airport via Airport West has been proposed under The Greens 2008 People Plan.

The currently congested Tullamarine Freeway and Calder Freeway interchange saw a redevelopment to help traffic flow easier in 2006–2007.

Seven bus routes operated by CDC Melbourne and Kastoria Bus Lines also service the suburb, and a Night Network also operates around the area.

Commerce

Westfield Airport West is a shopping centre that was built in the northern corner of the suburb. Opening in 1976 and undergoing redevelopments in 1982 and 1999, it includes Target, Kmart, Coles, Woolworths, Aldi and a Village Cinemas complex. Other shopping areas in the suburb are also located on McNamara Avenue. The suburb contains much light industrial, manufacturing, and freight businesses due to its proximity to Essendon Airport, Melbourne Airport and to the recently built DFO. Silver Circus, one of Australian's most popular circus is based in the area for over 40 years, though it often tours around Victoria.

Educational facilities

Airport West has one government primary school (Niddrie PS), a Catholic primary school (St. Christopher's PS) and a secondary school (Niddrie Campus, Essendon Keilor College). There is also the Bravissimi Italian Language School.

Sport

Airport West Football Club, an Australian Rules football team, competes in the Essendon District Football League.

North West Wolves play rugby league in NRL Victoria.

Notable people
 Ben Carroll, Victorian politician 
 Brian Mannix, singer and musician 
 Mark Thompson, VFL/AFL player and coach

See also
 City of Keilor – Airport West was previously within this former local government area.

References

Suburbs of Melbourne
Suburbs of the City of Moonee Valley